The Prior Building is an historic building in Victoria, British Columbia, Canada.  It is at the northeast corner of Government St. and Johnson St.

See also
 List of historic places in Victoria, British Columbia

References

External links
 

1888 establishments in Canada
Buildings and structures completed in 1888
Buildings and structures in Victoria, British Columbia